Stephen or Steven Brown may refer to:

Arts and entertainment
 Stephen Brown (athlete) (born 1969), Trinidadian hurdler
 Stephen Brown (composer) (born 1948), Canadian composer
 Stephen Brown (film producer) (born 1961), American film producer, media executive and entrepreneur
 Stephen Brown (Jesuit) (1881–1962), Irish writer, bibliographer, librarian
 Stephen Brown (playwright), English playwright
 Stephen Brown (television producer), American producer of game and reality shows
 Stephen Mark Brown, American opera singer
 Steven Brown (born 1952), member of the American band Tuxedomoon

Politics
 Stephen Brown (judge) (born 1924), member of the British privy council
 Stephen Campbell Brown (1829–1882), Australian politician

Science
 Stephen D. M. Brown (born 1955), British geneticist 
 Stephen G. R. Brown, British materials scientist

Sports
 Stephen Brown (canoeist) (born 1956), British sprint canoer
 Steven Brown (golfer) (born 1987), English golfer
 Steven Brown (judoka) (born 1986), Australian judoka who competed in the 2008 Olympics
 Steven Brown (cricketer) (born 1979), Zimbabwean cricketer
 Stevens Brown (1875–1957), English cricketer, referred to as Stephen Brown before 1911

Other people
 Stephen F. Brown (1841–1903), Union Army officer in the American Civil War
 Stephen Brown (diplomat) (born 1945), British diplomat

See also
 Steven Browne (born 1989), Australian rules footballer
 Stephen Brown-Fried, American stage director
 Stephen Brown House (disambiguation)
 Steve Brown (disambiguation)